Francesco Carrozzini (born September 9, 1982) is an Italian-born director and photographer based in the United States. In 2016, he made his feature directorial debut at the 73rd Venice International Film Festival with the documentary Franca: Chaos and Creation. In 2022, his first narrative feature, The Hanging Sun, closed the 79th Venice International Film Festival. He is known for his portrait photography and has directed music video for artists including Jay-Z, Lana Del Rey, Beyoncé and Lenny Kravitz. He has also directed commercials for brands such as Apple and Fiat.

Early life
Carrozzini was born in Monza, Italy. The son of Franca Sozzani, former editor-in-chief of Italian Vogue, he grew up in Milan. He began taking pictures and making short films with friends in his early teens. In the summer of 1999, he relocated to Los Angeles to study film at the University of California, Los Angeles. He later returned to Italy to study philosophy at the University of Milan before moving to New York City in 2004 to assist photographers such as Bruce Weber and Peter Lindbergh.

Career

Film
Carrozzini's first film job came at age 23, when he directed a commercial for the 51st Venice Biennale, commissioned by advertising agency McCann Erickson. He traveled to Poland the following year to shoot a documentary about the life and creative process of the Polish Theatre Wierszalin. Later that year, he collaborated with The New York Times on the creation of a project that became known as "The New York Times Screen Tests," a collection of intimate video interviews with entertainment figures that included Natalie Portman, Charlize Theron, and Marion Cotillard. The series received a nomination in the "New Approaches - Daytime Entertainment" category at the 37th Annual Daytime Emmy Awards.

In 2008, Carrozzini directed the short film "1937", a psychological thriller shot in Suite #822 of the infamous Chelsea Hotel, which screened in competition at the Venice Film Festival.

In the years since, he has directed commercials for clients such as Apple Music, Fiat 500 and Tommy Hilfiger. In 2009, his Ray Ban promo "Color Goes Pop" received a Young Director Award nomination at the Cannes Lions International Festival of Creativity.

In 2013, he began directing music videos and has collaborated with musicians Beyoncé, Jay-Z, Marilyn Manson and Lenny Kravitz, amongst others.

In 2016, Carrozzini debuted his first feature-length film, a documentary focusing on the life and legacy of his mother entitled Franca: Chaos and Creation. The film, which took Carrozzini roughly six years to complete, highlights the groundbreaking accomplishments of Sozzani's career in fashion publishing while also exploring the more personal relationship between a mother and her son. Franca: Chaos and Creation premiered on September 2, 2016, in the "Cinema Nel Giardino" category at the 73rd Venice International Film Festival. The film had its North American premiere as part of the Hamptons International Film Festival on October 8, 2016 and was featured at AFI Fest in Los Angeles. In March 2017, the film was honored with a Nastro d'Argento presented by the Italian National Syndicate of Film Journalists.
The film was released worldwide through Netflix on October 1, 2017.

In 2021, Carrozzini directed his first narrative feature film, The Hanging Sun, an adaptation of the novel Midnight Sun (2015) by Jo Nesbø. The film stars Charles Dance, Peter Mullan, Alessandro Borghi and Jessica Brown Findlay. The Hanging Sun had its world premiere as the closing film at the 79th Venice International Film Festival on September 10, 2022,

In February 2023 Carrozzini wrapped up shooting the Netflix Original Series "Supersex", based on the life of iconic porn star Rocco Siffredi

Photography
Carrozzini is also known for his portrait photography; he has photographed a diverse range of contemporary pop culture icons including actors Angelina Jolie, Robert De Niro, Cate Blanchett, and Scarlett Johansson; models Naomi Campbell, Heidi Klum, Linda Evangelista, Milla Jovovich, Stephanie Seymour and Tyra Banks; musicians Beyoncé, Lana Del Rey, Sting, Keith Richards, Kanye West, and Nicki Minaj, as well as artists Jeff Koons, Richard Prince, Andres Serrano, and Marina Abramović.

He has also worked several political figures; among them, former Nigerian President Goodluck Jonathan, former Prime Minister of the United Kingdom Tony Blair, former Pakistani Prime Minister Shaukat Aziz, former United Nations Secretary General Ban Ki-moon, and former New York City mayor Michael Bloomberg.

Carrozzini's images have appeared on the covers and in the pages of: Vanity Fair, The New Yorker, New York Magazine, W, Rolling Stone, L'Uomo Vogue, Vogue Italia and Pop, among others. His advertising client list includes Apple Inc., Estee Lauder, Biotherm, Sony Music, Mini Cooper, Roberto Cavalli, Ermenegildo Zegna, Salvatore Ferragamo, DKNY, Tommy Hilfiger, Levi's, Baume & Mercier and Chopard.

Other ventures

Franca Fund

In 2019 Francesco, joined by Harvard geneticist Robert C. Green and investor D. A. Wallach, launched the "Franca Sozzani Fund for Preventive Genomics"  at Harvard Medical to bring preventive genomics to patients everywhere.

Franca Sozzani, Francesco's mother, made a remarkable impact on global culture during her 28 years as the legendary editor-in-chief of Vogue Italia. And outside of fashion, she was a relentless champion of justice and human progress: a global ambassador against hunger for the United Nations World Food Programme, a supporter of AIDS research, and a chair of the European Institute of Oncology. Franca recognized that fashion and creativity held a unique power to deliver social messages, and in groundbreaking issues of Vogue Italia used beautiful images to explore difficult topics from oil spills to domestic violence.

Tragically, Franca succumbed to a rare cancer in 2016 that might have been prevented with earlier medical surveillance. Such is the case for thousands of patients around the world today who lack access to the proven risk-assessment and diagnostic toolkit that preventive genomics offer.

Extraordinary discoveries in genomics from the past two decades have not yet made it to average patients, remaining largely trapped in a research context in elite academic institutions. Routine medicine today extends to patients a mere sliver of the potential benefits of genetic sequencing, failing to recognize the demonstrated value of full-spectrum sequencing of over 5,000 genes that can predict disease, reproductive, and pharmacological risk in every patient. Misconceptions within the medical community, misrepresentations in the commercial sector, and confusion within governments have all delayed the implementation of these proven technologies and clinical care protocols.

Personal life
Carrozzini dated singer Lana Del Rey from 2014 until 2015. In 2018, Carrozzini married Bee Shaffer, the daughter of Vogue editor-in-chief Anna Wintour and child psychiatrist David Shaffer. In October 2021, they welcomed a son named Oliver Sozzani.

Videography

Filmography

Cinematography

Exhibitions
March 2004: Video installation "Pause", Duomo Cathedral, Milan
May 2007: Solo photography exhibition, "Unique Exposure", Galleria Cardi, Milan
May 2010: Solo photography exhibition, "Portraits", Diane Von Furstenberg Gallery, New York
January 2012: L'Uomo Vogue cover shots included in Sotheby's charity auction celebrating the magazine, Paris
May 2015: Solo photography exhibition, "Portraits", Istanbul'74 Arts Festival, Istanbul
September 2015: Solo photography and film exhibition, "Music", Earth Gallery, Paris

Awards & Special mentions
In September 2013, Carrozzini was included on Vanity Fair's International Best Dressed List.
In February 2016 Carrozzini and his team received an award from Global Green acknowledging the achievements for work done with Connect4Climate, part of the sustainable branch of the World Bank.
In 2017 Carrozzini's movie Franca: Chaos and Creation was awarded the Nastro D'Argento (Silver Ribbon) by the Italian Film press.

Venice Film Festival Jury
In 2019, Carrozzini served as juror for the Venice Virtual Reality section at the 76th Venice Film Festival alongside Laurie Anderson and Alysha Naples.

References

External links
 
 

1982 births
Living people
Italian film directors
Italian photographers
Italian emigrants to the United States
People from Monza
UCLA Film School alumni
University of Milan alumni
People from Greenwich Village